Oghwoghwa Is the forefather of four Urhobo Kingdoms in Urhobo Land in Nigeria, namely
Ogor (Ogọ) 
Ughelli (Ughẹne), 
Agbarha-Otor (Agbarha) and
Orogun. 

Each of the Kingdom is headed by a traditional ruler known as Ovie (King).

References 

Nigerian culture